Bulldog Drummond at Bay is a 1947 American adventure crime mystery film directed by Sidney Salkow and starring Ron Randell for the first time as the British sleuth and adventurer Bulldog Drummond. The cast also includes Anita Louise, Patrick O'Moore and Terry Kilburn.

The film is loosely based on the novel Bulldog Drummond at Bay by H. C. McNeile.

Plot
When thieves rob his country estate, Bulldog Drummond uncovers a deadly jewel caper involving foreign agents trying to steal plans for a top-secret British aircraft.

Cast
 Ron Randell as Bulldog Drummond
 Anita Louise as Doris Hamilton
 Patrick O'Moore as Algy Longworth
 Terry Kilburn as Seymour
 Holmes Herbert as Inspector McIvar
 Lester Matthews as Shannon
 Leonard Mudie as Meredith

Production
The Bulldog Drummond series had been popular B movies before the war. In June 1946 it was announced Venture Pictures, a Columbia producing unit headed by Lou Appleton and Bernard Small, had done a deal with the estate of H.C. McNeile to make two Bulldog Drummond pictures, with an option to provide six more (the last one had been Bulldog Drummond's Secret Police (1939)). John Howard had played Drummond in the 1930s but it was decided to use a new actor in the part.

In November 1946, it was announced that Drummond would be played by Ron Randell, an Australian actor who was signed to a long term contract with Columbia off the back of his performance in Smithy. Sidney Salkow would direct with filming to start in December. According to Appleton, "We wanted a new film face and someone with a British way of speaking."

Former child star Terry Kilburn was given an adult role.

Critical reception
The Monthly Film Bulletin called Randell "an attractive personality... a worthy successor as Drummond."

Leonard Maltin called the film an "innocuous British 'quota quickie'" 

Filmink wrote "This was an okay film, a little creaky – Randell wasn’t quite comfortable in the lead. "

References

External links

Bulldog Drummond at Bay t BFI
Bulldog Drummond at Bay at TCMDB
Bulldog Drummong at Bay at Letterbox DVD
Complete text of novel at Project Gutenberg

Films based on Bulldog Drummond
1947 films
British thriller films
1940s English-language films
1940s thriller films
Columbia Pictures films
American thriller films
American black-and-white films
Films directed by Sidney Salkow
1940s American films
1940s British films